Paectes nubifera is a species of moth in the family Euteliidae. It is found in North America.

The MONA or Hodges number for Paectes nubifera is 8965.

References

Further reading

 
 
 
 

Euteliinae
Articles created by Qbugbot
Moths described in 1912